This list contains the names of albums that contain a hidden track and also information on how to find them. Not all printings of an album contain the same track arrangements, so some copies of a particular album may not have the hidden track(s) listed below. Some of these tracks may be hidden in the pregap, and some hidden simply as a track following the listed tracks. The list is ordered by artist name using the surname where appropriate.

 C-Murder, Tru Dawgs: A song called "Betya," begins a few seconds after "How A Thug Nigga Like It" fades out.
 Cage the Elephant, Thank You, Happy Birthday: An alternative version of "Right Before My Eyes" starting around 3:49 of "Flow"
 John Cale:
 Paris 1919 (2006 rerelease): An unlisted instrumental version of "Macbeth"
 HoboSapiens: "Set Me Free" in the pregap before track 1
 Calexico: Feast of Wire: Rewind from first track to find instrumental track, title unknown
 Camouflage: Sensor - "Sensor Intro" - (0:35) - just some noises
 Camouflage: Relocated - "Relocated Intro" - (1:21) - based on track "Bitter Taste" with words "I've got a name for you... Relocated"
 Candy Coated Brick: Slow Children Playing - Five hidden tracks following track 16: "Flaming Ott Surprise", "Waltz of the Circus Peanuts", "Tojo's Theme", "Jimmy with Cold", and "The Rev. Charles T. Wilson Family Singers"
 Jim Capaldi - Whale Meat Again: A brief, tongue-in-cheek version of "We'll Meet Again" is included at the end.
 Cardiacs
 The Seaside: A short section of "Hymn" plays after "Nurses Whispering Verses", the sixth track and last on the A-side. The section is kept in Original Edition CD copies despite the lack of sides, although as Nurses Whispering Verses was omitted from the 1995 reissues the hidden track doesn't appear there either.
 On Land and in the Sea (Torso version): Six unlisted tracks are included: an untitled chimes motif that appears often among Cardiacs releases, the four tracks that appear on the Baby Heart Dirt single (which already appear as slightly different edits on the main album) and "Tarred And Feathered", which originates from the mini-album Big Ship.
 Sing to God: The final track on the first disc, "Wireless", transitions after seven minutes into a hidden orchestral arrangement named "Peril on the Sea". After a short silence following "Foundling", the album's final track, the same chimes motif appears as on On Land and in the Sea.
 Guns: "Secret Like Swans" plays after 42 seconds of silence past the final track.
 Cattle Decapitation, Human Jerky: Features a prank phone call after 2 minutes of silence on the track "Colon-Blo". 
 Pelle Carlberg: "Hit Song" : appears after brief silence on the final track of his album, In a Nutshell
 Brandi Carlile: "Hiding My Heart" : appears after brief silence on the final track of her album, The Story
 Vanessa Carlton:
 Harmonium: "The Wreckage" starts after the final track.
 Heroes & Thieves: A sudden barking of a dog can be heard after the end of the album.
 Carnival Art: Welcome to Vas Llegas The first track is not listen on the album sleeve and a song called The Pussycat song fades in where Pill Bugg ends.
 Aaron Carter, Another Earthquake: "Sugar" following "Keep Believing." "Sugar" is followed by Aaron thanking the listeners for buying the album, then introduces three clips of songs from his brother Nick's solo album, Now or Never.
 Cast
 All Change: On track 12 "Two of a Kind," at approximately 23:30, the isolated violin from Walkaway plays.
 Mother Nature Calls: On track 11 "Dance of the Stars," at 19:27 a piano plays.
 Magic Hour: On track 12, "Hideaway," at 19:43, the complete orchestral arrangement (Instrumental) from the track Alien
 The Cat Empire, Two Shoes: a hidden song "1001" plays at 5:37 on the final track
 Catalepsy: Bleed: The album contains an unlisted 11th track after the final track "Vexation," titled "Remix," which is a dubstep remix of the song "Goliath," which also appears on the album.
 Catatonia, Way Beyond Blue: "Gyda Gwên," a song in Welsh (the rest of the album is in English), begins at 10:39 of "Way Beyond Blue" (though from 9:37, unrehearsed voices and noises from the studio can be heard). The song is unlisted, but lyrics appear in the liner notes.
 Catch 22:
 Alone in a Crowd: Track number 22 is an untitled hidden song.
 Washed Up!: After the 4th track, there are some hidden live songs, which cut off abruptly after a while.
 Cave In: 
 Beyond Hypothermia: At the end of the tenth track there is a long silence followed by an additional few minutes of music.
 Tides of Tomorrow EP: "Dark Driving (demo)".
 Cephalic Carnage:
 Exploiting Dysfunction: Tracks 6, 9, 23 and 66 are hidden (tracks 16-22, 24-65 have no audio content).
 Lucid Interval: An untitled hidden track begins at 12:28 of the last track. Track 16 is also untitled and hidden.
 Xenosapien: Track 12 is an untitled hidden track.
 Kasey Chambers, Rattlin' Bones : The song "No Depression" is the hidden track on "Woe Is Mine."
 Chance the Rapper, Acid Rap : "Paranoia" is the hidden track on "Pusha Man."
 Tracy Chapman, New Beginning: "Save a Space for Me" (end of the album). Found at the 5:19 mark of "I'm Ready" on the CD.
 Chase Rice: Dirt Road Communion: "Kiss My Ass" can be found after about 40 seconds of silence after the end of the song, "Happy Hour(Worktape)"
 The Chemical Brothers, Surrender: Shortly after the last track, "Dream On," is an instrumental reprise of that same song.
 Cherry Ghost, Thirst for Romance "The Same God" can be found 14 minutes after "Mathematics" has ended. 
 Cherry Poppin' Daddies, Zoot Suit Riot: After a long period of silence from the last track, a Spanish version of "Zoot Suit Riot" plays.
 Children of Bodom:
 Something Wild: The last track, "Touch Like Angel of Death" contains a short keyboard instrumental after several minutes of silence. This track is called the "Coda". The album also contains an eighth track "Bruno the Pig", which is simply ten seconds of silence.
 Hate Crew Deathroll: Final track "Hate Crew Deathroll" is only 3:36, but if the listener increases the volume for the remaining 3 minutes and 2 seconds at the end of the track, the band can be heard having a lively conversation in their native tongue of Finnish.
 Christdriver, Everything Ends: After about two minutes of silence of the last track, there is a short movie sample.
 Circa Survive, Juturna: "House of Leaves" begins at around 8:55 of "Meet Me in Montauk," after the period of silence following the end of the first part of the song which ends at 1:56.
 Cirith Gorgor: Unveiling the Essence: Cover of Darkthrone's "In The Shadow of the Horns" on track 0. Running time of roughly 5:40
 CKY, Volume 1: "Rio Bravo Reprise" begins at 4:33 of "To All of You" and ends at 5:31. There follows a barely audible 32 Hz rumble before "Halfway House" begins at 19:37.
 Gilby Clarke, Swag: The song "Don't Lynch The Blacks" is at the end of the album.
 Kelly Clarkson, My December: The hidden track "Chivas" plays one minute after the final track "Irvine" at the 5:18 mark
 The Clash:
 Clash on Broadway: hidden track on CD3 - "The Street Parade" (originally issued on "Sandinista!)"
 London Calling: "Train in Vain (Stand by Me)" 'was originally unlisted'
 Sandinista!: Reprise of "The Guns of Brixton" at the end of side 4 (or, disc 2 track 6 on the CD)
 Clearlake, Cedars: A track of instrumental, ambient music appears if you rewind from track 1.
 Clinic, Bubblegum: untitled instrumental hidden in pregap
 Cloud Cult, Advice from the Happy Hippopotamus: track number 25 is an unlisted song called "Bobby's Spacesuit"
 Clumpy Bogg, Steamer (album): Untitled montage of studio banter and short session jam of opening track Clumpy Time exists in the pregap before track 1. Additionally an unlisted rehearsal appears following the synchronised toilet flushes following track 10, the unlisted rehearsal itself spans 59 tracks of around 5 seconds each to accommodate drummer Forest Clump's wishes that the number 69 show in CD players as a visual analogy of pigs tails.
 Clutch, The Elephant Riders: Each copy of the album contains one of the following hidden songs, which is on the same track as "Dragonfly." "David Rose" "Gifted & Talented" or "05." The Japanese version of the album, however, contains all three bonus tracks.
 Roger Clyne and the Peacemakers: "Americano!" Contains two tracks, the first is silence and the second is the song "A Little Hungover You"
 Coal Chamber, Coal Chamber: An untitled track starts about two minutes of silence after the track "Pig".
 Jarvis Cocker, Jarvis: "Running The World" begins at 29:36 of final track
 CocoRosie, Tales of a Grass Widow: “Devil's Island” begins at 13:38 of “Poison”
 Coheed and Cambria:
 The Second Stage Turbine Blade: "IRO-Bot" at the end of the album
 In Keeping Secrets of Silent Earth: 3: "2113" at track 23
 Good Apollo, I'm Burning Star IV, Volume One: From Fear Through the Eyes of Madness: "Bron-Y-Aur" at the end of the album
 Good Apollo, I'm Burning Star IV, Volume Two: No World For Tomorrow: At the end of the last track "The End Complete V: On The Brink" there is a reference to "The Willing Well IV,The Final Cut" intro guitar riff after several seconds of silence along with some solos.
 Year of the Black Rainbow: The title track cuts very abruptly, and after ten seconds of silence, a creepy reprise of "One" fades in with more mechanical noise, and before the fade-out occurs, a man laughing maniacally can be heard.
 COIN, How Will You Know If You Never Try: "Nothing Matters" after 3:20 of the track "Lately II".
 Cold, Year of the Spider: "Gone Away" at 16:12 of the track, "Kill The Music Industry".
 Cold Chisel, The Last Wave of Summer: After the title track, is the hidden track called "Once around the Sun".
 Cold War Kids, Robbers and Cowards: "Sermon vs. the Gospel" begins at 7:20 of the final track
 Coldplay:
 Parachutes: "Life is for Living" begins at 5:39 of the final track "Everything's Not Lost"
 X&Y: "Til Kingdom Come" at the end of the album; this was hidden, but frequently mentioned in interviews with the band promoting X&Y
 Viva la Vida or Death and All His Friends: "Chinese Sleep Chant" begins at 4:05 of "Yes" and "The Escapist" begins at 3:30 of "Death and All His Friends"
 Mylo Xyloto: Though not strictly a hidden track, "I Go to Rio" (a song Peter Allen) is sampled in the song "Every Teardrop is a Waterfall." There is also a hidden track two minutes exactly into "UFO." The actual song "UFO" finishes at 1:55 but the hidden track begins at 2:00, and it an atmospheric sound that suddenly stops after around 15 seconds, with a segue into "Princess of China."
 Coldplay Live 2012: "Aiko" appeared in the track "Intermission 3", "Aiko" was an instrumental rework of "Major Minus", from the Mylo Xyloto album.
 Ghost Stories: The track "O" begins with a hidden song, "Fly On." After more than two minutes of silence following "Fly On", the actual track "O" starts at the 6:18 mark. On the Target deluxe edition, the silence is cut short because there are bonus tracks at the end of the album, making "O" 5:23.
 A Head Full of Dreams: "X Marks the Spot" begins at 3:25 of "Army of One"
 Collective Soul's song "She Said" was the hidden track on their fourth album Dosage, but was later released on their greatest hits collection, 7even Year Itch, as a self-contained track, rather than sharing a track with another song.
 Edwyn Collins, Gorgeous George: "Moron" Track 12 at end of album
 Phil Collins, Face Value: "Over The Rainbow" can be heard if you turn up the volume at 4:14 on the final track "Tomorrow Never Knows."
 Commix: Call To Mind: "Satellite Song" (Underground Resistance Remix) follows shortly after "Strictly."
 Consortium of Genius: Free Brains and Dead Bodies: "You're Still Listening?" is heard following a period of silence after Track 27, "Secret Backwards Message."
 The Contortionist: Apparition: The final track "Predator" is 11:42 long, with the actual song lasting until 5:24, followed by silence until 10:06, where a guitar solo is played until the end.
 William Control The last song of Hate Culture, London Town features recorded 911 call that starts playing a few minutes after it ends. The authenticity has been debated.
 Jesse Cook, Vertigo: Track 10, a cover of Sting's song "Fragile" featuring guest vocalist Holly Cole, is followed by an extended jam session that the album's liner notes calls "Wednesday Night at Etric's" (probably referring to former Alta Moda bassist Etric Lyons, who performs with Cook on this album).
 Cool for August, Grand World: Unlisted track "Spinning" hidden at the end of the album.
 Alice Cooper, Dirty Diamonds: A new song, likely called "The Sharpest Pain", appears after the final (bonus) track, "Stand".
 Copeland:
 Know Nothing Stays the Same (2004): Track 73 is a remix of the band's cover of Billy Joel's "She's Always A Woman To Me."
 Dressed Up & In Line (2007): After about 15 minutes of silence in the last track, an outtake of the band's cover of grunge band Soundgarden's single "Black Hole Sun."
 Imani Coppola, Chupacabra (album): "My Day (At the Ocean)," roughly sixteen minutes after track 11 "La Da Da."
 Cormega The Realness: Fallen Soldiers (Remix) is followed by Killaz Theme featuring Havoc of Mobb Deep. The song was later put Cormega's the Testament (album).
 Corrosion Of Conformity, Eye for an Eye: Cover of Fleetwood Mac's "Green Manalishi" is not listed on the back cover on first editions of the album.
 Chris Cornell, Scream: After a period of silence on the last track, "Watch Out," a blues song called "Two Drink Minimum" begins.
 Counting Crows:
 Across a Wire: Live in New York City: Unlisted track "Chelsea" after a lengthy pregap.
 This Desert Life: "Kid Things" at the end of the album
 Hard Candy: "Big Yellow Taxi" (on the original release)
 Wayne County & the Electric Chairs: Storm the Gates of Heaven: The album opens with an unlisted cover of the traditional folk tune "The Hearse Song," which is included on the same track as the title song.
 Course of Empire, Initiation: "Running Man" hidden in the pregap, and "The Gate / Tomorrow" after track 10 (it also sounds differently when played in mono)
 Graham Coxon, The Sky Is Too High: Between tracks 10 and 11 on the back cover is a song titled "(pause)," which has been scribbled out, making it unreadable to some. On the album though, it does not appear, making it the opposite of a hidden track. A similar thing happened to a song called "DUI" on Green Day's album Shenanigans. However, there is a seven second silent pregap between tracks 10 and 11 and this could have been the intended "(pause)".
 Cracker:
 Gentleman's Blues: "1-202-456-1414" (the touch-tone phone tone for the White House) at track 18; "1-202-514-8688" (phone tone for The Justice Department) at track 20; "1-310-289-4459" (phone tone for Beverly Hills psychotherapist Julia Kantor) at track 22, and; "Cinderella" at track 24
 Kerosene Hat: "Eurotrash Girl," "I Ride My Bike," and "Kerosene Hat rehearsal" at tracks 69, 88 and 99 respectively
 Cradle of Filth
 The Principle of Evil Made Flesh: Track 13 "Imperium Tenebrarum" – 0:49
 The Cranberries, No Need to Argue  there is four minutes of silence at the end of the song "No Need to Argue".
 Crashdog: The Pursuit of Happiness: "Love Is Costly And Words Are Cheap" on Track 13
 Crazy Town:
 The Gift of Game: at track number 32 there is a man (who sounds like Matt Pinfield) raving about how good Crazy Town is.
 Darkhorse: there are two hidden tracks: "You're the One," which is on track 23 after twenty-three seconds of silence and "Them Days" at track 32.
 Crass: On Penis Envy there is an unlisted track at the end of the album on CD and vinyl which is their flexi-disk release of "My Wedding" as attached the Bride Magazine.
 Creed: Human Clay The Australian release of the album had a bonus track called "Young Grow Old" and starts after 14 additional seconds of silence at the end of the previous track "Inside Us All" to give the effect of a hidden track.
 Criteria, En Garde (2003) - rewind from track 1 into negative timing, features a song by Team Rigge
 Crocodile Shop, Beneath (1996) - A remix of the song "Right Thru You" starts playing after approximately 2 minutes of silence following the final track "Driver Down".
 David Cross, It's Not Funny: Several minutes after the end of the last track is a brief section of Cross' standup show, evidently edited out of the rest of the performance, in which he recounts an encounter with Scott Stapp of Creed backstage on Celebrity Poker Showdown. On the vinyl edition, this track is only accessible (at the end of side one) by placing the needle at the end of the track. The needle will in effect be carried backwards toward the outer circle of the record.
 Sheryl Crow, The Globe Sessions (1998): "Subway Ride" (This hidden track follows a 38-second stretch of silence following the last song "Crash and Burn." The hidden track is also available on the B-side of the single "My Favorite Mistake," another track from The Globe Sessions.)
 Crowded House, Woodface (1991): "I'm Still Here" (This hidden track follows a long stretch of silence following the last song "How Will You Go").
 The Crystal Method: Tweekend: "Name of the Game [Original Version]" (Following a long stretch of silence at the end of the last track, "Tough Guy.")
 The Cult, Pure Cult: for Rockers, Ravers, Lovers, and Sinners (1993): Although not a hidden track, an entire bonus disc is included in the album and remains completely unlisted on the artwork. Its track listing appears on the reverse back cover, of which the live disc faces. The live disc is called 'The Marquee' and is split into two parts, with the parts on different discs, with only one part (disc) in an album, thus making it unknown which disc you are going to get.
 The Cure:
 Greatest Hits DVD (2001): "The Caterpillar," "Pictures of You," and "Close to Me (Closest Mix)" all appear as easter egg-style hidden tracks.
 Three Imaginary Boys (1979): "Untitled" a.k.a. "The Weedy Burton" (Track 13, the last track on the album).
 Curver: Haf: Additional unnamed song after long silence at end of track "Í Fallinni Borg"
 Cypress Hill:
 Cypress Hill (album): There is a hidden reprise of "Stoned Is The Way of the Walk," a couple seconds after "Born To Get Busy" fades out.
 III: Temples of Boom: An untitled instrumental song begins to play after "No Rest for the Wicked" Ends.
 Skull & Bones: A couple seconds after "Stank Ass Hoe" fades out, a very short untitled instrumental song starts.

See also
 List of backmasked messages
 List of albums with tracks hidden in the pregap

References 

C